Robert Kiss may refer to:

 Róbert Kiss (born 1967), Hungarian fencer
 Robert S. Kiss (1957–2021), American politician